Domagoj Drožđek (born 20 March 1996) is a Croatian professional footballer who plays as a winger for Varaždin .

Club career
Born in Varaždin to a Croatian father and German mother, Drožđek started his youth career with the academy of Varteks before joining Dinamo Zagreb. He moved to German club Borussia Dortmund in 2013, after agreeing to a three and a half year deal.

After a stint with Borussia Dortmund II, Drožđek returned to Croatia and joined third tier club Varaždin on 1 September 2016. During the 2017–18 season, he scored 16 league goals (including a hat-trick against Gorica), and won the Best Player of the Tournament award.

On 30 August 2018, Drožđek joined first tier club Lokomotiva.

On 23 February 2021, Drožđek joined K League 2 side Busan IPark for an undisclosed fee.

References

External links

1996 births
Living people
Sportspeople from Varaždin
Croatian people of German descent
Association football forwards
Croatian footballers
Croatia youth international footballers
Borussia Dortmund II players
NK Varaždin (2012) players
NK Lokomotiva Zagreb players
Busan IPark players
Regionalliga players
Croatian Football League players
First Football League (Croatia) players
K League 2 players
Croatian expatriate footballers
Expatriate footballers in Germany
Croatian expatriate sportspeople in Germany
Expatriate footballers in South Korea
Croatian expatriate sportspeople in South Korea